Atomic Bomb is the third studio album by Filipino rock band Rivermaya. It has 16 tracks and was released by BMG Records (Pilipinas) Inc. on 31 January 1997.

It was reported that the album had gone gold before it hit the stores on January 31. Basing on initial orders from Metro Manila record bars, BMG shipped out 25,000 cassettes. Major record bars in malls reported they were out of stock after a few days. In the Philippines, an album must sell 20,000 copies to be certified gold.

This is the last Rivermaya album with Bamboo Mañalac as lead singer.

Track listing
All tracks by Rico Blanco, except where noted.

Personnel
Francisco "Bamboo" Mañalac – lead vocals, backing vocals (track 6)
Rico Blanco – guitars, keyboards, backing vocals, lead vocals (tracks 5, 11, 12)
Nathan Azarcon – bass guitar, lead vocals (track 6)
Mark Escueta – drums & percussion, lead vocals (track 6)

Album credits
Producer: Rico Blanco
Executive producer for Rana Entertainment, Inc.: Chito Roño & Lizza G. Nakpil
Executive producers for BMG Records Pilipinas: Rudy Y. Tee
A&R direction: Vic Valenciano
Sound engineer: Slick
Assistant sound engineers: Caryl Campos & Minnith Mota
Album mix: Slick with Rivermaya
Recorded at Digital FX International Inc.
Additional string tracks recorded at Cinema Audio, Inc. Recording Studio
Package design: Ariel Dalisay of Artworks Adv.
Cover photography: courtesy of Philippine Daily Inquirer
B&W inside photography: courtesy of Philippine Daily Inquirer
Back cover and color photography: Eddie Boy Escudero
Strings for "If" and "Luha" arranged by Mel Villena
Strings for "If" and "Luha" performed by Sonata Strings led by Benjie Bautista

Accolades

References

1997 albums
Alternative rock albums by Filipino artists
Bertelsmann Music Group albums
Rivermaya albums